Uwe Konstantin Blab (born March 26, 1962) is a German former professional basketball player who had a five-year career in the National Basketball Association (NBA).

High School and College 
Blab attended Effingham High School in Illinois, which won second place in the Illinois High School Association (IHSA) State Basketball tournament in 1980. He played college basketball for the Indiana University Hoosiers, averaging 16 points per game in his senior season. He helped IU win the Big Ten championship in 1983 and then advance to the NCAA Tournament's "Elite Eight" the following season.

National team career 
Blab was first selected to the West Germany national team for the EuroBasket in 1983. He was also part of the team at the 1984 Summer Olympics, after graduating from Indiana University. A year later, he helped the team to a fifth place finish at EuroBasket 1985. Seven years later, Blab was able to participate in the 1992 Summer Olympics, this time for a unified Germany.

NBA 
Drafted 17th overall by the Dallas Mavericks in the 1985 NBA Draft, he never proved to be a significant contributor. His first four seasons were with the Mavericks, and he played for both the Golden State Warriors and the San Antonio Spurs in his final year. He finished with NBA career averages of 2.1 points and 1.8 rebounds per game at the center position.

Career statistics

NBA

Regular season

|-
| align="left" | 
| align="left" | Dallas
| 48 || 0 || 8.5 || .468 ||   || .537 || 1.9 || .4 || .1 || .3 || 2.6
|-
| align="left" | 
| align="left" | Dallas
| 30 || 0 || 5.3 || .392 ||   || .464 || 1.2 || .4 || .1 || .3 || 1.8
|-
| align="left" | 
| align="left" | Dallas
| 73 || 1 || 9.0 || .439 ||   || .708 || 1.8 || .5 || .1 || .4 || 2.2
|-
| align="left" | 
| align="left" | Dallas
| 37 || 0 || 5.6 || .462 ||   || .800 || 1.2 || .3 || .1 || .4 || 1.8
|-
| align="left" | 
| align="left" | Golden State
| 40 || 33 || 12.0 || .379 ||   || .548 || 2.5 || .6 || 0 || .6 || 2.1
|-
| align="left" | 
| align="left" | San Antonio
| 7 || 0 || 7.1 || .545 ||   || .500 || 1.3 || .1 || 0 || .0 || 2.1
|- class="sortbottom"
| align="center" colspan="2"| Career
| 235 || 34 || 8.4 || .433 ||  || .608 || 1.8 || .4 || .1 || .4 || 2.1

Playoffs

|-
|style="text-align:left;"|1986
|style="text-align:left;"|Dallas
|1||0||6.0||.667||–||–||1.0||.0||.0||.0||4.0
|-
|style="text-align:left;"|1987
|style="text-align:left;"|Dallas
|1||0||10.0||1.000||–||.250||3.0||.0||1.0||1.0||3.0
|-
|style="text-align:left;"|1988
|style="text-align:left;"|Dallas
|3||0||2.7||.000||–||1.000||.3||.3||.0||.0||.7
|-
|align=left|1990
|align=left|San Antonio
|2||0||2.5||.000||–||.500||1.0||.0||.0||.0||1.5
|- class="sortbottom"
|style="text-align:center;" colspan=2|Career
|7||0||4.1||.429||–||.500||1.0||.1||.1||.1||1.7

References

External links 

1962 births
Living people
Alba Berlin players
Basketball players at the 1984 Summer Olympics
Basketball players at the 1992 Summer Olympics
Centers (basketball)
Dallas Mavericks draft picks
Dallas Mavericks players
German expatriate basketball people in the United States
Golden State Warriors players
Indiana Hoosiers men's basketball players
National Basketball Association players from Germany
German men's basketball players
Olympic basketball players of Germany
Olympic basketball players of West Germany
Parade High School All-Americans (boys' basketball)
San Antonio Spurs players
Sportspeople from Munich